Grădina Icoanei ("Icon's Garden") is a small park in central Bucharest, situated not far away from Piața Romană and Bulevardul Magheru. The park, located next to Gheorghe Cantacuzino Plaza in Sector 2 of the city, was inaugurated in 1873.

The Bulandra Theatre (the Toma Caragiu stage, Sala Toma Caragiu),  (now called "Ion Voicu"), the Icoanei Church, and the Anglican Church are located in the park's immediate vicinity.

History
In a city plan from 1852, the area occupied now by the park was designated as Maidanul Stăpânirii, signifying a city-owned town square. In the area was the Icoana Pond, from which the Bucureștioara brook sprang, and a wooded grove, which formed the nucleus of the present-day park. At that time, the garden was at the outskirts of the city; it was a place where parties were held, lovers met, and fiddlers sang among the bushes. 

A female character is at the base of the statue, holding a tablet with her left hand; the feather she was holding in her right hand has since disappeared. In another corner of Grădina Icoanei is the bronze bust of Adrian Păunescu, a poet who lived near the park; the bust, made by the sculptors Ioan Deac-Bistrița and Dragoș Neagoe, was inaugurated in 2012. From November 2021 to February 2022 the park was completely renovated, under a 2.7 million leis contract; the two fountains were changed and the main lanes, originally covered with sand, were paved with a layer of crushed limestone, on top of which a layer of gravel was laid.

References

Icoanei, Gradina
1873 establishments in Romania
Historic monuments in Bucharest